Tabory is the name of several rural localities in Russia:
Tabory, Severodvinsk, Arkhangelsk Oblast, a village under the administrative jurisdiction of the city of oblast significance of Severodvinsk,  Arkhangelsk Oblast
Tabory, Onezhsky District, Arkhangelsk Oblast, a village in Posadny Selsoviet of Onezhsky District of Arkhangelsk Oblast
Tabory, Vilegodsky District, Arkhangelsk Oblast, a village in Nikolsky Selsoviet of Vilegodsky District of Arkhangelsk Oblast
Tabory, Kaluga Oblast, a village in Zhizdrinsky District of Kaluga Oblast
Tabory, Kirov Oblast, a village in Bystritsky Rural Okrug of Orichevsky District of Kirov Oblast
Tabory, Nizhny Novgorod Oblast, a village in Kotelnitsky Selsoviet of Chkalovsky District of Nizhny Novgorod Oblast
Tabory, Omsk Oblast, a village in Novoyagodinsky Rural Okrug of Znamensky District of Omsk Oblast
Tabory (selo), Dobryanka, Perm Krai, a selo under the administrative jurisdiction of the town of krai significance of Dobryanka in Perm Krai
Tabory (settlement), Dobryanka, Perm Krai, a settlement under the administrative jurisdiction of the town of krai significance of Dobryanka in Perm Krai
Tabory, Okhansky District, Perm Krai, a selo in Okhansky District of Perm Krai
Tabory, Gdovsky District, Pskov Oblast, a village in Gdovsky District of Pskov Oblast
Tabory, Kunyinsky District, Pskov Oblast, a village in Kunyinsky District of Pskov Oblast
Tabory, Alapayevsky District, Sverdlovsk Oblast, a village in Alapayevsky District of Sverdlovsk Oblast
Tabory, Taborinsky District, Sverdlovsk Oblast, a selo in Taborinsky District of Sverdlovsk Oblast
Tabory, Vologda Oblast, a village in Kalininsky Selsoviet of Totemsky District of Vologda Oblast